The Marchfeld (Morava Field) is the north area of the Vienna Basin which is a sedimentary basin between the Eastern Alps and the Western Carpathians.

History and location
This historical region is known from the Battle on the Marchfeld. It is located in the southeast of the Weinviertel, Gänserndorf District and is a river basin formed by the river Morava.

Sights

 Schloss Hof
 Castle Marchegg

References

External links

Geology of Austria
Gänserndorf District
Sedimentary basins of Europe